Shambala Preserve is an animal sanctuary established in 1972 and located in Acton, California, a desert community  southwest of Palmdale, off of California State Route 14 and  north of Los Angeles.

About
Shambala is maintained by the Roar Foundation, founded by actress Tippi Hedren in 1983 as a 501(c)(3) nonprofit organization. Shambala cares for endangered exotic big cats such as African lions, Siberian tigers and Bengal tigers, leopards, servals, mountain lions, bobcats, plus a lynx, a Florida panther, and a liger. Shambala is accredited by the American Sanctuary Association.

Most of the animals at Shambala were born in captivity, orphans, are no longer wanted at circuses or zoos, or are given up by private owners who could no longer care for them. For example, Shambala became the new home for Michael Jackson’s two Bengal tigers, Sabu and Thriller, after he decided to close his zoo at his Neverland Valley Ranch in Los Olivos, California.

The animals are not wild and are human dependent for their needs. Shambala provides expert veterinarians for care. Carefully planned diets are supplied by Natural Balance Pet Foods.

While Shambala welcomes all volunteers, they may not work directly with the animals.

Shambala Preserve was also home to a pair of African bush elephants named Timbo and Kura. Timbo also starred in Hedren's film Roar as well as a documentary known as "The Elephant Man" (known also as "Tusks and Tattoos") in which the elephant's relationship with his caretaker, Chris Gallucci, was explored. Timbo, one of the largest bull elephants ever recorded in captivity, was brought to the preserve in 1972, and died of natural causes at age 48 in 2005. Kura meanwhile died in 2000 at the age of 41.

Staff
The current president is Tippi Hedren and vice-president is Stephen Shultz.  Advisory board members have included: Loni Anderson, Melanie Griffith (Tippi Hedren's daughter), Lily Tomlin, Steve Valentine, Donald Spoto, and Betty White.  Veterinarians include: Jon J. Bernstein, DVM; Gay Naditch, DVM; and Chris Cauble, DVM.

References

External links

Melanie Griffith in Shambala Preserve

Geography of Palmdale, California
Parks in Los Angeles County, California
Protected areas established in 1983
Wildlife sanctuaries of the United States
Zoos in California
Cat sanctuaries